Affective disposition theory (ADT), in its simplest form, states that media and entertainment users make moral judgments about characters in a narrative which in turn affects their enjoyment of the narrative.  This theory was first posited by Zillmann and Cantor (1977), and many offshoots have followed in various areas of entertainment (Raney, 2006a).  Entertainment users make constant judgments of a character's actions, and these judgments enable the user to determine which character they believe is the "good guy" or the "villain". However, in an article written in 2004, Raney examined the fundamental ADT assumption that viewers of drama always form their dispositions toward characters through moral judgment of motives and conduct. Raney argued that viewers/consumers of entertainment media could form positive dispositions toward characters before any moral scrutinizing occurs. He proposed that viewers sometimes develop story schemas that provide them "with the cognitive pegs upon which to hang their initial interpretations and expectations of characters" (Raney, 2004, p. 354). The basic idea of the affective disposition theory is used as a way to explain how emotions become part of the entertainment experience.

Theory history and application 
Disposition theory has multiple applications in many areas of entertainment.  Its most basic premise is that entertainment users attach an emotion to various characters within a narrative, but this has been expanded to comedy, drama, tragedy, violence, and sport (Raney, 2006a).  Although some theorist argue that the similar theories used to explore different forms of entertainment media encompass the same general processes, some evidence exists that disposition formation may differ across content. Sapolsky's research (1980) found that viewer race rather than the previously mentioned "morality" was an accurate predictor in team favorability in an all-White versus all-Black basketball game. With regard to antihero narratives, researchers such as Sapolsky have suggested that the actual formation process of dispositions may differ from the traditional affective disposition theory formula. The traditional Disposition Theory is closely related to misattribution theory of humor.  Disposition Theory takes the position that entertainment users are just an audience, they are not active.  By employing this perspective, the audience does not experience real emotion towards the events in the narrative, but rather experience suspense instead.  Traditional Disposition Theory is most often applied in the context of humor, but is also applicable to drama and sports.

Raney (2006a) offered six principles that are shared amongst all applications of disposition theory:

"Disposition-based theories are concerned with the enjoyment or appreciation of media content." (pg. 144)
"Disposition-based theories are concerned with emotional responses to media content." (pg. 145)
"Disposition-based theories contend that media enjoyment starts with and is driven by the viewer's feelings about the character." (pg. 145)
"Disposition-based theories contend that affiliations towards characters are formed and maintained on a continuum from extreme positive through indifference to extreme negative affect." (pg. 146)
"Because disposition-based theories rely upon the evaluation of conflict outcomes between characters, justice consideration are a necessary component of the theories." (pg. 147)
"Disposition-based theories further acknowledge and rely upon the differences between individuals in terms of emotional responsiveness, personal experiences, basal morality, and countless other psychological and social-psychological factors." (pg. 147)
As stated earlier, disposition theories can be applied in many contexts, but most share similar characteristics, as identified by Raney (2006).  In summation, these six principles are strongly centered around the ideas of enjoyment of entertainment and emotional responses.  These theories can be used to formulate narratives and create drama and emotional arousal during a story.  Using these six principles, one can surmise that creating a strong and opposing disposition for the characters in the story will lead to greater enjoyment for the viewer.  By making a villain's actions terribly amoral, and the hero's actions extremely moral, one can create emotional arousal in a viewer.

Model of forming dispositions 
Zillmann (1996) offered a model of disposition formation.  The model begins with a character's behavior and ends with approval of the story.  There are seven main steps in disposition formation:

Perception and Assessment – In this step, the viewer simply observes the act of the character.
 Moral Judgment – The viewer judges the action of the character as either appropriate and moral or inappropriate and amoral.  Here, the model splits paths.  If the viewer believes the act to be amoral, disposition formation takes a strikingly different route than if the viewer believes the act to be moral and appropriate.  From here, the moral route will be referred to as moral and the amoral route will be referred to as amoral.
Affective Disposition – Here, if the viewer decides the character is following the moral route, they begin to form positive affect toward that character.  The opposite is true if the viewer decides the character is following the amoral route.
Anticipation and Apprehension – Here, the viewer hopes for a positive outcome and fears a negative outcome for the moral character while fearing a positive outcome and hoping for a negative outcome for the amoral character.
Perception and Assessment – The outcome is viewed and an emotion is attached.
Response to Outcome/Emotion – The viewer decides how they feel about the story and characters.
Moral Judgment – The viewer decides if they approve of the outcome of the story or disapprove of it.

This model further illuminates the disposition process.  As stated earlier, if a story incites a strong disposition toward any character, viewer enjoyment is likely to be higher due to the emotional arousal created by the narrative.  Through this model, one can pinpoint where and how a disposition is created.  This model also displays the steps the viewer goes through to create a disposition.

Application 
The creator of any narrative can use Disposition Theory to heighten emotional arousal, and therefore enjoyment, in any narrative.  By applying the steps of the disposition model a writer can heighten the experience of a narrative.  Creating a strong disposition towards the characters will lead the viewer to hope for a positive outcome for the hero and a negative outcome for the villain, all the while fearing a negative outcome for the hero and fearing a positive outcome for the villain.  By delaying this outcome, the writer can create suspense in the viewer.  By creating suspense, the writer can heighten emotional arousal and, therefore, heighten enjoyment of the narrative.  In summation, by creating a strong disposition towards characters, a writer can heighten the audience's enjoyment of the narrative.

Applied to sports spectatorship 
The concepts of the traditional affective disposition theory have been applied to sports media consumption by considering the fact that enjoyment could be conceived as the emotional response to consuming media surrounding players or teams. The exploration of enjoyment of sport spectatorship is very complex and must take into account fan socialization and disposition formation. Research on fan socialization investigates how people are originally socialized as sports fans, and also examines the reasons why people form allegiances towards specific teams. Raney (2006b) states that these allegiances and types of socializations are at the core of the entertainment motivation for viewing sports media.

The specific version of the disposition theory that is used in sport media viewing (Disposition Theory of Sport Spectatorship) applies the basic ideas of the disposition theory to sports content. The basic premise that is used to cross over into the world of sport is that enjoyment of entertainment is primarily a reflection of both the consumers' feelings toward the players or teams and the outcomes (Zillmann, 1991, 2000; Zillmann & Cantor, 1977; Raney, 2004a, 2004b; Raney, 2006b; Peterson & Raney, 2008). Raney (2006b) also found that the expectation of experiencing enjoyment is the greatest reason that sports media viewers report for why they consume sports media.

According to academic researchers and theorist (Bryant & Raney, 2000; Zillman, Bryant & Sapolsky, 1989; Zillman & Paulus, 1993), the Disposition Theory of Sports Spectatorship states that a viewer's affiliation or allegiance to a particular team or player must be discussed along a continuum. This continuum ranges from extremely positive through indifference to extremely negative. Raney (2006b) posits that the enjoyment of viewing a sporting event comes as a by-product of a combination of the outcome of the game, and the viewers strength and valence of dispositions held toward the competitors. Exposure to the competitors over time allows individuals to develop these dispositions of varying valence and degree toward teams and athletes. In more simplistic terms, the enjoyment of the spectator or viewer has been found to increase the more the winning team is favored by the spectator/viewer and the more the losing team is disliked by the spectator/viewer. Henceforth, the maximum enjoyment of the spectator comes when the intensely liked team or player defeats the intensely disliked team or player.

Additionally, research indicates that sports fanship in general is important to enjoyment of sports media. Specifically, Gantz & Wenner (1991, 1995) found that the selective exposure to media and motivations for viewing sports media literatures indicate that fanship in relation to the particular sport also impacts perceptions about the contest. Therefore, the argument can be made that this level of dispositional affiliation toward the sport might also impact perceived suspense and enjoyment.

Raney and Depalma (2006) also noted that the nature of the sport being view, either scripted or unscripted, cause viewers to approach the sporting event with differing expectations of enjoyment. The uncertainty of outcomes for contests that are unscripted when combined with multiple other factors such as rivalry strength and importance of the game to the overall ranking of the team affect the suspense and enjoyment of viewing.

References 

Bryant, J., & Raney, A.A. (2000). Sports on the screen. In D. Zillmann & P. Vorderer (Eds.), Media entertainment: The psychology of its appeal (pp. 153–174). Mahwah, NJ: Erlbaum.
Gantz, W., & Wenner, L. A. (1991). Men, women, and sports: Audience experiences and effects. Journal of Broadcasting & Electronic Media, 35, 233–243.
Gantz, W., & Wenner, L. A. (1995). Fanship and the television sports viewing experience. Sociology of Sports Journal, 12, 56–74.
Peterson, E. M., & Raney, A. A. (2008). Reconceptualizing and Reexamining Suspense as a Predictor of Mediated Sports Enjoyment. Journal of Broadcasting & Electronic Media, 52(4), 544–562.
Raney, A. A. (2004). Expanding disposition theory: Reconsidering character liking, moral evaluations, and enjoyment. Communication Theory, 14(4), 348–369.
Raney, A. A. (2006a). The psychology of disposition-based theories of media enjoyment. In J. Bryant & P. Vorderer (Eds.), Psychology of entertainment (pp. 137–150). Mahwah, NJ: Erlbaum.
Raney, A. A. (2006b). Why We Watch and Enjoy Mediated Sports. In A. A. Raney, J. Bryant (Eds.), Handbook of sports and media (pp. 313–329). Mahwah, NJ US: Lawrence Erlbaum Associates Publishers.
Raney, A. A., & Depalma, A. J. (2006). The Effect of Viewing Varying Levels and Contexts of Violent Sports Programming on Enjoyment, Mood, and Perceived Violence. Mass Communication & Society, 9(3), 321–338.
Sapolsky, B. S. (1980). The effect of spectator disposition and suspense on the enjoyment of sport contests. International Journal of Sport Psychology, 11, 1–10.
Vorderer, P., & Knobloch, S. (2000).  Conflict and suspense in drama.  In D. Zillmann, & P. Vorderer (Eds.), Media entertainment: The psychology of its appeal (pp. 56–68).  Mahwah, NJ: Lawrence Erlbaum Associates.
Zillmann, D., & Cantor, J. (1977). Affective responses to the emotions of a protagonist. Journal of Experimental Social Psychology, 13(2), 155–165.
Zillman, D., (1991). Television viewing and psychological arousal. In J. Bryant  D. Zillman (Eds.), Responding to the screen: Reception and reaction process (pp. 103–133). Hillsadale, NJ: Lawrence Erlbaum Associates.
Zillman, D., (2000). Mood management in the context of selective exposure theory. In M. E.  Roloff (Ed.),  Communication Yearbook 23 (pp. 103–123). Thousand Oaks, CA: Sage.
Zillman, D., Bryant, J., & Sapolsky, B. (1989).  Enjoyment of watching Sport Contests. In J.H. Goldstein (Ed.), Sports, Games, and play: Social and Psychological Viewpoints (2nd ed., pp. 241–287). Hillsadale, NJ: Lawrence Erlbaum Associates.
Zillman, D., & Paulus, P. B. (1993). Spectators: Reactions to sporting events and effects on athletic performance. In R. N. Singer, M. Murphey, & L. K. Tennant (Eds.), Handbook of research on sports psychology (pp. 600–699). New York: Macmillan.
Zillmann, D. (1996).  The psychology of suspense in dramatic exposition.  In P. Vorderer, W. J. Wulff, & M. Friedrichsen (Eds.), Suspense: conceptualizations, theoretical analyses, and empirical explorations (pp 199–231). Mahwah, NJ: Lawrence Erlbaum Associates

Belief
Meta-ethics